Kıncıvo (also, Kncıvo, Qıncvo, and Konzhavu) is a village and municipality in the Lerik Rayon of Azerbaijan.  It has a population of 202. It served as a minor logistical staging point for petroleum drilling operations during the peak of the Azerbaijan's oil industry expansion immediately prior to and during World War II. In the post-World War II era, the town also played a role in the shift of the petroleum industry into offshore exploration.

External links 
 

Populated places in Lerik District